Schuyler DeBarthe Ranson Grant (born April 29, 1970) is an American former actress best known for playing Diana Barry in Anne of Green Gables (1985) and for other supporting roles in television.

Education 
Grant graduated from Columbia University, where she met her husband, Jeff Krasno, in 1993.

Family

Grant is the daughter of Jack Grant and Ann Grant. She has one brother, Jason Grant.

Her paternal grandmother was Connecticut historian, Marion Hepburn, sister of actress Katharine Hepburn and daughter of suffragist Katharine Martha Houghton Hepburn, who played a prominent role in the American Birth Control League with Margaret Sanger that would evolve into Planned Parenthood. Her paternal grandfather was Ellsworth Strong Grant, a historian and former mayor of West Hartford, Connecticut, who was a direct descendant of Puritan minister, Thomas Hooker.

Notable relatives in the acting world include her aunt Katharine Houghton and her great-aunt Katharine Hepburn.

Anne of Green Gables fame
Grant is best known for her work in the Canadian Anne of Green Gables mini-series, in which she played Diana Barry opposite Megan Follows as Anne Shirley. Grant reprised her role in the sequel Anne of Avonlea (1987), in which Diana married Fred Wright and had a child, as well as the trilogy's finale Anne of Green Gables: The Continuing Story (2000).

Additional roles
Grant also played the role of Camille Hawkins on All My Children. This character had a brief romance with another All My Children character, Tad Martin.

Filmography

See also
Houghton family

External links

References 

1971 births
Living people
American television actresses
People from Los Gatos, California
20th-century American actresses
Actresses from the San Francisco Bay Area
American soap opera actresses
American child actresses
Columbia College (New York) alumni
21st-century American women